José Luís Alpalhão Regada Prazeres, known as Zé Luís Araque (born 15 January 1975) is a retired Portuguese football midfielder.

References

1975 births
Living people
People from Beja, Portugal
Portuguese footballers
S.C. Salgueiros players
AD Fafe players
S.C. Campomaiorense players
Imortal D.C. players
Seixal F.C. players
C.D. Beja players
Association football midfielders
Primeira Liga players
Sportspeople from Beja District